William Morris was Mayor of Galway, 1527-28.

Morris was the first of two members of his family who would serve as Mayors of Galway. A law passed during his term outlawed the playing of games such as hurling and handball, with archery and football encouraged in its place. His descendants would include Baron Killanin, and the filmmaker John Ford.

See also

 Tribes of Galway

References
 History of Galway, James Hardiman, Galway, 1820.
 Old Galway, Maureen Donovan O'Sullivan, 1942.
 Henry, William (2002). Role of Honour: The Mayors of Galway City 1485-2001. Galway: Galway City Council.  
 Martyn, Adrian (2016). The Tribes of Galway: 1124-1642

Mayors of Galway
Politicians from County Galway